Shota Rustaveli Street is a street in the neighborhood of Bessarabka in the Pecherskyi District of Kyiv. It runs from Basina Street to Zhilyanska Street.

History
The street arose in the 1830s in connection with the planning and construction of the area in the valley of the Lybid. At first, it was called Mala Vasylkivska (laid parallel to Velika Vasylkivska). In 1926, it was renamed Borochov Street, in honor of the Jewish public figure Ber Borochov. It received its current name in 1937 in honor of the medieval Georgian poet Shota Rustaveli.

Notable buildings
Brodsky Synagogue

References

Streets in Kyiv